Mathilde is an alternative spelling of the names Matilde or Matilda, and could refer to:

Mathilde Dolgopol de Sáez (1901 –1957), Argentinian vertebrate paleontologist
 Mathilde, Abbess of Essen (949–1011)
 Mathilde Alanic (1864-1948), French novelist, short story writer
 Mathilde Bonaparte (1820-1904), French princess and salonnière
 Matilde Camus (1919–2012), Spanish poet
 Mathilde Esch (1815–1904), Austrian genre painter
 Mathilde Hupin (born 1984), Canadian orthopaedic surgeon and cyclist
 Mathilde Kschessinska (1872–1971), ballet dancer
 Mathilde Wildauer (1820–1878), actress and opera singer
 Queen Mathilde of Belgium (born 1973)
 Elsie and Mathilde Wolff Van Sandau (alive in 1914), British suffragette sisters
 253 Mathilde, an asteroid
 Mathilde (film), a 2004 film
 "Mathilde" (song), by Jacques Brel, 1964
 Matilde di Shabran, an opera by Gioachino Rossini
 Schipper naast Mathilde, a 1950s Flemish TV series